Robert Downes DD (died 20 June 1763)  was a Church of Ireland bishop in the mid 18th century.

Downes was the son of an Anglican bishop, Henry Downes. He was educated at Merton College, Oxford. He held incumbencies at Balteagh, Desertmartin and Kilcronaghan and was appointed Prebendary of Comber in 1734. He was Dean of Derry from 1740 until 1744; Bishop of Ferns and Leighlin from 1744 until 1752; Down and Connor from 1752 until 1753 and Raphoe from 1753 until his death on 20 June 1763.

Notes

1763 deaths
Clergy from Derry (city)
Alumni of Merton College, Oxford
Deans of Ossory
Bishops of Ferns and Leighlin
Bishops of Down and Connor
Bishops of Raphoe
17th-century Anglican bishops in Ireland
18th-century Anglican bishops in Ireland